Stella Vander (born Stella Zelcer, also known as Stella; 12 December 1950) is a French singer and musician.

Early years
Born in Paris into a family of Polish immigrants, she began writing music in the early sixties together with her uncle Maurice Chorenslup. Their songs were parodies of the Yé-yé style that was popular at the time. Stella's first EP, which included "Pourquoi pas moi", was released in November 1963, when she was twelve. In 1966, "Un air du folklore Auvergnat" ("a folk song from Auvergne", mocking Sheila's "Le Folklore Américain") increased her fame, followed by protests by the Auvergnat association—which took the lyrics seriously. Her take on music was "engagingly sarcastic". 1966's Beatnicks D'Occasion targeted  weekend  scenesters. Her final record as Stella was released in 1967. "I wasn't even 17 yet, but I just said 'Ok, pfft. Leave it.

Magma
She married Magma drummer Christian Vander and has appeared on numerous Magma albums. During the band's hiatus, she divorced Christian and married Francis Linon, the band's sound engineer. The couple started Seventh Records to organise Magma's work and to release some of Christian Vander's personal works. Since Magma's reformation in the late 1990s, she has assumed a larger role in the band's studio and performance efforts, and is currently Magma's most enduring and prominent vocalist.

Solo albums
In 1991 she released her first solo album as Stella Vander, D'épreuves d'amour (Seventh A-VIII).
Le coeur allant vers (Ex-Tension, with Sophia Domancich) appeared in 2004.
In 2011 Passage du Nord Ouest (Seventh AKT XVII 2 CD) was released (recorded in Paris, 29/12/1991). Pourquoi pas moi, a compilation of 40 tracks from the years 1963–1968, was released in 1997 (Magic records 2 CD).

References

Yé-yé singers
1950 births
French people of Polish descent
French-language singers
Musicians from Paris
Living people
Magma (band) members
Vander, Stella